Joao Joshimar Rojas López (born 16 August 1997) is an Ecuadorian footballer who plays as a winger for Liga MX club Monterrey and the Ecuador national team. He made his international debut for Ecuador on 14 November 2019 in a 3–0 win against the Trinidad and Tobago.

Club career
On 22 December 2016 Rojas moved from S.D. Aucas to Emelec.

On 30 June 2022 Rojas transferred from C.S. Emelec to Monterrey.

References

1997 births
Living people
Ecuadorian footballers
Ecuador under-20 international footballers
Ecuador international footballers
Ecuadorian Serie A players
S.D. Aucas footballers
C.S. Emelec footballers
Association football midfielders
Association football wingers
People from El Oro Province